Jan Karl Vydra is an Australian farmer and businessman.

Born to Alena and Jerry Vydra on 14 April 1982, in a small town in the Czech republic called Mariánské Lázně, immigrated to Australia in 1985 to become an Australia businessman and Australia's young farmer of the year 2011.

He runs Australian Fresh leaf Herbs, a fresh herb producer in Australia and Nucleus Logic, a Tech Start up. that specialises transforming business supply chains into the new age of cloud computing

Jan acknowledges that food production needs to be more sustainable and mixed with popular technology to encourage the future of farmers to take up their positions as producers of food.

The title of Young farmer of the year in 2011 was followed by a listing in Melbourne's Top 100 most influential people published by The Age Newspapers, which allowed Jan Vydra to have a voice in the Sustainable agriculture industry Australia while building a spin-off cloud computing company Nucleus Logic.

References

 https://nuffield.com.au/jan-vydra-2/
 https://www.goodfruitandvegetables.com.au/story/5301136/urban-farming-on-the-rise/
 https://www.weeklytimesnow.com.au/agribusiness/horticulture/urban-farming-campuses-to-bring-food-closer-to-consumers/news-story/621cd11911e2687ca39de8edaead03d6
 https://www.sunshinecoastdaily.com.au/news/call-on-govt-to-fund-farming-start-ups/1192595/

Australian farmers
1982 births
Living people